The 2017–18 NCAA Division I men's basketball season began on November 10, 2017. The first tournament was the 2K Sports Classic and the season ended with the Final Four in San Antonio on April 2, 2018. Practices officially began on September 29, 2017.

Rule changes
The following rule changes were proposed for the 2017–18 NCAA Division I men's basketball season:
 Expanding the coaches' box from 28 feet to 38 feet.
 Resetting the shot clock to 20 seconds when the ball is inbounded in the front court after a foul or violation (ex. kicked ball) by the defense. If there are more than 20 seconds on the shot clock in this situation, the shot clock will not be reset. Previously the shot clock was reset to the full 30 seconds regardless of the time remaining on the shot clock.
 Allow referees to use instant replay in the final 2:00 of the second half and/or overtime to determine if a secondary defensive player was either inside or outside of the restricted arc.  If the defender was inside the arc, a blocking foul will be called.  If the defender is outside of the restricted area, then a player control foul (charge) will be called.
 Require a minimum of 0.3 seconds to be taken off the game clock when the ball is legally touched on a throw-in or other situation. 
 Make throw-in spots more consistent in the front court.
 Redefine a "legal screen" to require the inside of the screener's feet be no wider than his shoulders.

The NCAA approved a number of experimental rule changes for use in the 2018 postseason NIT:
 Games were played in 10-minute quarters instead of 20-minute halves, matching current practice in NCAA women's basketball.
 The "one-and-one" foul shot was not used. Instead, starting with the fifth total foul in each quarter, non-shooting fouls by the defensive team resulted in two free throws, with the only exception being administrative technical fouls. This also matched current NCAA women's practice.
 The three-point line was extended to the current FIBA distance of 6.75 m (22 ft 1.75 in) from the center of the basket, except where the arc approaches the sideline; the line was a minimum distance of 3 feet (0.91 m) from the sidelines.  
 The free throw lane was extended to the 16-foot width used in NBA and FIBA play, instead of the NCAA standard of 12 feet.
 After an offensive rebound, the shot clock was reset to 20 seconds instead of 30.

Season headlines
 May 9, 2017 – The Missouri Valley Conference (MVC) announced that it extended an invitation to Valparaiso University to take effect July 1, with negotiations between the parties ongoing. Under its terms, the Crusaders would replace Wichita State University, departing on the same date for the American Athletic Conference.
 May 10 – The NCAA announced its Academic Progress Rate (APR) sanctions for the 2017–18 school year. A total of 17 programs in 9 sports were declared ineligible for postseason play due to failure to meet the required APR benchmark, including the following four Division I men's basketball teams:
 Alabama A&M
 Grambling State
 Savannah State 
 SE Missouri State
Savannah State was later granted a waiver by the NCAA to be able to compete in postseason play.
 May 25 – The MVC officially announced Valparaiso would join on July 1, as reported earlier in the month.
 June 15 – Following a prolonged investigation into the Louisville program, after claims by a self-described madam that she had provided strip shows and sex parties at the Cardinals' team residence, Minardi Hall, for Cardinals players and prospective recruits, the NCAA announced the following penalties, subject to a planned appeal by Louisville:
 Four years of probation.
 A reduction of four scholarships in all over the probation period, with Louisville choosing when to take the reductions. 
 Former director of basketball operations Andre McGee, who was found to have paid $10,000 from 2010 to 2014 in exchange for the parties, received a 10-year show-cause penalty.
 Head coach Rick Pitino was suspended for the Cardinals' first five ACC games in the coming season.
 Louisville was required to forfeit all money received from conference revenue sharing stemming from its appearances in the 2012–2015 NCAA tournaments.
 All players who participated in the parties and played for Louisville were held to be ineligible. The school had 45 days to provide the NCAA with a list of games affected, and was to vacate any games in which ineligible players were involved. This would ultimately cost Louisville its 2013 national championship and 2012 Final Four appearance (see February 20), making Louisville the first Division I basketball champion (for either sex) to be stripped of its title.
 June 16 – The governing boards of the Indiana University and Purdue University systems gave final approval to the split of Summit League member Indiana University – Purdue University Fort Wayne (IPFW) into two separate institutions, ratifying a plan that both boards had approved in December 2016. On July 1, 2018, IU took over IPFW's degree programs in health sciences under the identity of Indiana University Fort Wayne, while Purdue took over all other degree programs as Purdue University Fort Wayne. The IPFW athletic program would continue in Division I and the Summit League, but represent only Purdue Fort Wayne. The athletic program branding was changed from Fort Wayne Mastodons to Purdue Fort Wayne Mastodons on June 18, 2018.
 June 28 – The Horizon League announced that IUPUI would move from the Summit League to replace Valparaiso effective July 1.
 August 24 – The University of Alaska Anchorage announced that the Great Alaska Shootout, which the school had hosted since 1978 and was the longest-running regular-season college basketball tournament, would be discontinued after this season.
 September 26 – The office of the United States Attorney for the Southern District of New York announced that 10 individuals, including assistant coaches at Arizona, Auburn, Oklahoma State, and USC, had been arrested on federal corruption charges. The accused were allegedly part of a scheme by which coaches accepted bribes to steer NBA-bound college players toward certain agents and financial advisers. Court documents also allege that an apparel company later identified as Adidas paid $100,000 to the family of an unnamed player to ensure his signing with an unnamed school that was later identified as Louisville.
 September 27 – In the first major fallout from the breaking bribery scandal, Louisville placed head coach Rick Pitino on unpaid administrative leave and athletic director Tom Jurich on paid administrative leave. Media reports indicated that both would be formally fired once contractual issues were sorted out. Assistant David Padgett was named interim head coach.
 September 28 – CBS News reported that Rick Pitino was the Louisville coach identified in court documents as "Coach-2", who was alleged to have spoken several times with an Adidas executive in the attempt to pay the family of a recruit in exchange for the player attending Louisville.
 November 6 – The Associated Press preseason All-American team was released. Michigan State forward Miles Bridges was the leading vote-getter (61 votes). Joining him on the team were Notre Dame forward Bonzie Colson (47 votes), Arizona guard Allonzo Trier (39), Villanova guard Jalen Brunson (33) and Missouri forward Michael Porter Jr. (30).
 November 27 – The Big West Conference announced that California State University, Bakersfield (CSU Bakersfield) and the University of California, San Diego (UC San Diego), already affiliate members, will join the conference in July 2020. CSU Bakersfield, a Big West beach volleyball member, will leave the Western Athletic Conference. UC San Diego, a member of Big West men's volleyball that will add women's water polo to its Big West membership in 2019–20, will transition from NCAA Division II and the California Collegiate Athletic Association; it will not be eligible for Division I national championships until the 2024–25 school year.
 December 30 – On what ESPN called "the day college basketball went nuts", four top-10 teams lost—top-ranked Villanova, #3 Arizona State, #5 Texas A&M, and #10 TCU, with all except for A&M entering the day unbeaten. The end result marked the first time in the AP Poll era (since 1948–49) that no major-college men's team was unbeaten before the new calendar year.
 February 12 – Virginia rose to #1 in the AP Poll for the first time since 1982, becoming the first team in poll history to move up to the #1 ranking despite losing a game in the prior week. Despite the Cavaliers' overtime loss at home to Virginia Tech the previous weekend, the previous #1 and #3 teams, respectively Villanova and Purdue, also lost at home.
 February 20 – The NCAA announced that it had denied Louisville's appeal of sanctions imposed in the wake of the basketball program's sex scandal, officially making the Cardinals the first Division I basketball program stripped of a national title.
 February 28 – Mountain West Conference commissioner Craig Thompson confirmed to the San Diego Union-Tribune that his conference had discussed potential expansion with six schools since August 2017, with current West Coast Conference member Gonzaga the only school he specifically named. Thompson added that if the MW added Gonzaga, it could do so possibly as early as the 2018–19 school year. In addition, while Thompson said that BYU had not contacted him about expansion, several sources indicated that the school may return to the MW, at least in non-football sports, if Gonzaga were to join.
 April 2 – Gonzaga athletic director Mike Roth notified the MW and WCC that the school would remain in the WCC for the immediate future. This followed WCC scheduling and revenue distribution changes that Gonzaga had long advocated.

Milestones and records
During the season, the following players reached the 2000 career point milestone – Tennessee guard James Daniel III, Central Arkansas guard Jordan Howard, Marquette guard Andrew Rowsey, Murray State guard Jonathan Stark, Xavier guard Trevon Bluiett South Dakota State forward Mike Daum, Campbell guard Chris Clemons Creighton guard Marcus Foster, Fairfield guard Tyler Nelson, Davidson forward Peyton Aldridge, Troy guard Wesley Person, Eastern Washington swingman Bogdan Bliznyuk, Western Michigan guard Thomas Wilder and Butler forward Kelan Martin.
November 11 – Mike Krzyzewski won his 1,000th game with Duke, becoming the first men's coach to reach that mark at one Division I school, as Duke beat Utah Valley 99–69.
November 16 – Roy Williams became the first coach to win 400 games at two different schools (Kansas, North Carolina) as he led the Tar Heels to a victory over Bucknell.
November 17 – Oregon head coach Dana Altman won his 600th career game in Division I, as his Ducks defeated Alabama State 114–56.
December 19 – Oklahoma freshman point guard Trae Young tied the NCAA Division I single game assists record (22) in a 105–68 victory over Northwestern State. He also scored 26 points, becoming the first player in 20 seasons to record a 20-point/20-assist game.
January 2 – Lehigh’s Kahron Ross became the Patriot League’s all-time assist leader by recording his 600th assist in a loss to Navy. The previous record of 599 had been held by Holy Cross' Jave Meade since 2004. Earlier in the season, Ross had become Lehigh's all-time leader, passing Mackey McKnight.
January 3 – Mike Brey became Notre Dame's all-time winningest coach, notching his 394th victory at the school with an 88–58 home win over North Carolina State. He passed Digger Phelps on the school's win list with the victory.
January 17 – Chris Mack became Xavier's all-time winningest coach, notching his 203rd victory at his alma mater with an 88-82 home win over St. John's. He passed his former coach Pete Gillen on the school's list with the victory.
 February 11 – Houston guard Rob Gray became the American Athletic Conference′s all-time leading scorer, passing SMU's Nic Moore.
 February 22 – Drexel overcame a 53–19 first-half deficit to defeat Delaware 85–83. The 34-point deficit was the largest ever erased by a winning Division I men's team, surpassing a 32-point deficit erased by Duke in defeating Tulane in 1950.
 February 24 – Kansas defeated Texas Tech 74–72 to clinch at least a share of its 14th consecutive Big 12 regular-season title. This gave the Jayhawks sole possession of the Division I men's record for the most consecutive regular-season conference titles, breaking a tie with UCLA (1967–1979).
 March 1 – Virginia defeated Louisville by making 5 points in the final second (0.9) of regulation, including a buzzer beater three-point bank shot from De'Andre Hunter, in a comeback highly noted for its statistical improbability. The Virginia Cavaliers won 67-66 achieving the first 9-and-0 ACC road record in league history and first perfect league road mark since Duke went 8-and-0 in 2011-12.
 March 9 – Bogdan Bliznyuk of Eastern Washington became the Big Sky Conference’s all-time leading scorer, passing Orlando Lightfoot’s mark of 2,102 set in 1994. Earlier in the season, Bliznyuk claimed the school all-time scoring mark, passing Venky Jois’ total of 1,803.
 March 16 – 16 seed UMBC upset top-seeded Virginia 74–54 in a first round NCAA tournament game in Charlotte. The game marked the first time in history that a 16 seed defeated a top seed.

Conference membership changes

Three schools joined new conferences for the 2017–18 season.

In addition to the schools changing conferences, the 2017–18 season was the last for four schools in their then-current conferences.
 North Dakota left the Big Sky Conference for the Summit League.
 Hampton and USC Upstate respectively left the Mid-Eastern Athletic Conference and Atlantic Sun Conference to become members of the Big South Conference.

Arenas

New arenas
 DePaul played its first season at Wintrust Arena, replacing Allstate Arena.
 NJIT played its first season at the Wellness and Events Center, replacing Fleisher Center.
 UMBC began the season at the Retriever Activities Center, the team's home since 1973, before opening the new UMBC Event Center on February 3.
 Wofford played its first season at Jerry Richardson Indoor Stadium, replacing Benjamin Johnson Arena.

Arenas closing 
 Elon played its final season at Alumni Gym, home to the Phoenix since 1949. The school opened the new Schar Center, with more than three times the capacity of Alumni Gym, for the 2018 women's volleyball season (which precedes the basketball season).
 Marquette's men's team played its final season at the BMO Harris Bradley Center, home to the Golden Eagles since 1988. The team continues to share an arena with the NBA's Milwaukee Bucks, both having started play in the new Fiserv Forum for the 2018–19 season.

Temporary arenas 
Three Division I men's teams played the 2017–18 season in temporary homes due to renovation of their current venues. A fourth team moved its home schedule to what is normally an alternate home for the same reason. One additional team is playing in two temporary venues while its previous venue is being replaced by a completely new structure at the same site.
 Cincinnati, which normally plays at the on-campus Fifth Third Arena, shared Northern Kentucky's BB&T Arena. 
 Houston was renovating Hofheinz Pavilion, which was renamed Fertitta Center once it reopened in December 2018, several months behind schedule. The Cougars played the 2017–18 season at Texas Southern's Health and Physical Education Arena, and remained there until Fertitta Center reopened.
 Northwestern played at Allstate Arena while Welsh–Ryan Arena was being renovated.
 Robert Morris closed the Charles L. Sewall Center, home to the Colonials since 1985, in June 2017. The UPMC Events Center is currently being built at the Sewall Center site and was originally scheduled to open in the middle of the 2018–19 basketball season. The Colonials played most of their 2017–18 home games at PPG Paints Arena in downtown Pittsburgh, with another Pittsburgh venue, Duquesne's A. J. Palumbo Center, used when PPG Paints Arena was not available. (Due to construction delays, the new arena will not open until the summer of 2019; RMU chose instead to play its 2018–19 home games at the Student Recreation and Fitness Center, a building in the on-campus North Athletic Complex that opened in September 2017 as part of the arena project.)
 Villanova moved its entire home schedule, with one exception, to its alternate home of Wells Fargo Center during renovations to its on-campus home of The Pavilion, which was renamed Finneran Pavilion when it reopened for the 2018–19 season. The November 29 game against Big 5 rival Penn was played at Jake Nevin Field House, which had been the team's home before the Pavilion's initial 1986 opening.

Season outlook

Pre–season polls

 
The top 25 from the AP and USA Today Coaches Polls.

Regular season

Early season tournaments

Upsets
An upset is a victory by an underdog team.  In the context of NCAA Division I Men's Basketball, this generally constitutes an unranked team defeating a team currently ranked in the Top 25. This list will highlight those upsets of ranked teams by unranked teams as well as upsets of #1 teams. Rankings are from the AP poll.

Bold type indicates winning teams in "true road games"—i.e., those played on an opponent's home court (including secondary homes, such as Intrust Bank Arena for Wichita State).

In addition to the above listed upsets in which an unranked team defeated a ranked team, there were eleven non-Division I teams to defeat a Division I team this season. Bold type indicates winning teams in "true road games"—i.e., those played on an opponent's home court (including secondary homes).

Conference winners and tournaments
Each of the 32 Division I athletic conferences ends its regular season with a single-elimination tournament. The team with the best regular-season record in each conference is given the number one seed in each tournament, with tiebreakers used as needed in the case of ties for the top seeding. The winners of these tournaments receive automatic invitations to the 2018 NCAA Division I men's basketball tournament.

Statistical leaders

Postseason

NCAA tournament

Tournament upsets
For this list, an "upset" is defined as a win by a team seeded 7 or more spots below its defeated opponent.

Final Four – Alamodome, San Antonio, TX

National Invitation tournament

After the NCAA tournament field was announced, the NCAA invited 32 teams to participate in the National Invitation Tournament. The tournament began on March 13, 2018 with all games prior to the semifinals being played at campus sites.

NIT Semifinals and Final
Played at Madison Square Garden in New York City on March 27 and 29

College Basketball Invitational

The eleventh College Basketball Invitational (CBI) Tournament began on March 13, 2018. This tournament features 16 teams who were left out of the NCAA tournament and NIT.

CollegeInsider.com Postseason tournament

The eighth CollegeInsider.com Postseason Tournament began on March 12, 2018 and ended with the championship game on March 30. This tournament places an emphasis on selecting successful teams from "mid-major" conferences who were left out of the NCAA tournament and NIT. 26 teams participate in this tournament.

Conference standings

Award winners

2018 Consensus All-America team

Major player of the year awards
Wooden Award: Jalen Brunson, Villanova
Naismith Award: Jalen Brunson, Villanova 
Associated Press Player of the Year: Jalen Brunson, Villanova
NABC Player of the Year: Jalen Brunson, Villanova
Oscar Robertson Trophy (USBWA): Jalen Brunson, Villanova
Sporting News Player of the Year: Jalen Brunson, Villanova

Major freshman of the year awards
Wayman Tisdale Award (USBWA): Trae Young, Oklahoma
 NABC Freshman of the Year: Marvin Bagley III, Duke
Sporting News Freshman of the Year: Trae Young, Oklahoma

Major coach of the year awards
Associated Press Coach of the Year: Tony Bennett, Virginia
Henry Iba Award (USBWA): Tony Bennett, Virginia
NABC Coach of the Year: Tony Bennett, Virginia
Naismith College Coach of the Year: Tony Bennett, Virginia
 Sporting News Coach of the Year: Mick Cronin, Cincinnati

Other major awards
Bob Cousy Award (Best point guard): Jalen Brunson, Villanova
Jerry West Award (Best shooting guard): Carsen Edwards, Purdue
Julius Erving Award (Best small forward): Mikal Bridges, Villanova
Karl Malone Award (Best power forward): Deandre Ayton, Arizona
Kareem Abdul-Jabbar Award (Best center): Ángel Delgado, Seton Hall
Pete Newell Big Man Award (Best big man): Marvin Bagley III, Duke
NABC Defensive Player of the Year: Jevon Carter, West Virginia
 Naismith Defensive Player of the Year (inaugural award): Jevon Carter, West Virginia
Senior CLASS Award (top senior): Jevon Carter, West Virginia
Robert V. Geasey Trophy (Top player in Philadelphia Big 5): Jalen Brunson, Villanova
Haggerty Award (Top player in New York City metro area): Shamorie Ponds, St. John's
Ben Jobe Award (Top minority coach): Donte Jackson, Grambling State
Hugh Durham Award (Top mid-major coach): Ryan Odom, UMBC
Jim Phelan Award (Top head coach): Chris Holtmann, Ohio State
Lefty Driesell Award (Top defensive player): Jevon Carter, West Virginia
Lou Henson Award (Top mid-major player): Clayton Custer, Loyola (Illinois)
Lute Olson Award (Top non-freshman or transfer player): Jalen Brunson, Villanova
Skip Prosser Man of the Year Award (Coach with moral character): 
Academic All-American of the Year (Top scholar-athlete): Jevon Carter, West Virginia
Elite 90 Award (Top GPA among upperclass players at Final Four): Matt Kennedy, Villanova
USBWA Most Courageous Award: Sam Dowd, Idaho State

Coaching changes
Several teams changed coaches during and after the season.

See also

2017–18 NCAA Division I women's basketball season

References